The Kolbäck Bridge is a bridge crossing the Ume River in the eastern parts of the city of Umeå in northern Sweden. The bridge connects the island Ön in the river to the mainland on both sides. It crosses Lillån on the west side of the island and Storån on the east side.

The total length is 522 meters. It carries 3 lanes of European route E4, though it was originally designed for 2. The bridge was constructed between 1998 and 2001.

References

External links
 

Bridges completed in 2001
Umeå
Cable-stayed bridges in Sweden
Buildings and structures in Västerbotten County